Vermont House may refer to:

Vermont House of Representatives
Shelburne Museum Vermont House, Shelburne, Vermont
Vermont House and Fenton Grain Elevator, Fenton, Michigan